ISMC may stand for:

 International Council for Ski Mountaineering Competitions
 Institute for the Study of Muslim Civilisations
 The International Society of Motor Control 
 The International Soil Modeling Consortium — ISMC 
 International Singapore Maths Competition